Fink Run is a stream in the U.S. state of West Virginia. It is a tributary of the Buckhannon River.

Fink Run most likely was named after Henry Fink, an early settler.

See also
List of rivers of West Virginia

References

Rivers of Lewis County, West Virginia
Rivers of Upshur County, West Virginia
Rivers of West Virginia